Jean Carlos Silva Rocha (born 10 May 1996), known as Jean Carlos, is a Brazilian professional footballer who plays for Polish club Raków Częstochowa as a winger.

Club career
Born in Prata, Minas Gerais, Jean Carlos moved to Spain in 2007 at the age of 11 and joined Yanida's youth setup. After representing CD Tenerife and CP Parla Escuela, he moved to Real Madrid in 2010.

After finishing his graduation, Jean Carlos was loaned to Segunda División B side CF Fuenlabrada on 28 July 2015, for one year. He made his senior debut on 23 August by starting in a 3–0 away win against Getafe CF B, and scored his first goal on 6 September in a 1–0 home win against CD Guadalajara.

In July 2016 Jean Carlos moved to Granada CF after cutting ties with Los Blancos, and was assigned to the reserves also in the third level. He made his first team – and La Liga – debut on 19 May of the following year, coming on as a second-half substitute for compatriot Andreas Pereira in a 1–2 home loss against RCD Espanyol.

International career
On 28 May 2015, Jean Carlos was called up by Brazil under-20s manager Alexandre Gallo for the year's FIFA U-20 World Cup. He featured in five matches during the tournament, scoring one goal against North Korea on 7 June.

References

External links

1996 births
Living people
Sportspeople from Minas Gerais
Brazilian footballers
Association football wingers
CF Fuenlabrada footballers
Club Recreativo Granada players
Granada CF footballers
Wisła Kraków players
Pogoń Szczecin players
Raków Częstochowa players
La Liga players
Segunda División B players
Ekstraklasa players
Brazil under-20 international footballers
Brazilian expatriate footballers
Brazilian expatriate sportspeople in Spain
Brazilian expatriate sportspeople in Poland
Expatriate footballers in Spain
Expatriate footballers in Poland